Mārtiņš Onskulis (born 18 June 1994) is a Latvian alpine skier. He was born in Sigulda. He competed at the 2014 Winter Olympics in Sochi, in  giant slalom and slalom.

References

External links

1994 births
Living people
Alpine skiers at the 2014 Winter Olympics
Latvian male alpine skiers
Olympic alpine skiers of Latvia
People from Sigulda